The 1983 State of the Union Address was given by the 40th president of the United States, Ronald Reagan, on January 25, 1983, at 9:00 p.m. EST, in the chamber of the United States House of Representatives to the 98th United States Congress. It was Reagan's second State of the Union Address and his third speech to a joint session of the United States Congress. Presiding over this joint session was the House speaker, Tip O'Neill, accompanied by George H. W. Bush, the vice president.

The speech lasted approximately 46 minutes  and contained 5554 words. The address was broadcast live on radio and television.

The Democratic Party response was delivered by Senator Robert Byrd (WV), Senator Paul Tsongas (MA), Senator Bill Bradley (NJ), Senator Joe Biden (DE), Rep. Tom Daschle (SD), Rep. Barbara Kennelly (CT), House Speaker Thomas P. O'Neill III (MA), Rep. George Miller (CA), Rep. Les AuCoin (OR), Rep. Paul Simon (IL), Rep. Timothy Wirth (CO), and Rep. Bill Hefner (NC).

See also
Speeches and debates of Ronald Reagan

References

External links

 (full transcript), The American Presidency Project, UC Santa Barbara.
 1983 State of the Union Address (video) at C-SPAN
 Full video and audio, Miller Center of Public Affairs, University of Virginia.

State of the Union addresses
State union 1983
98th United States Congress
State of the Union Address
State of the Union Address
State of the Union Address
State of the Union Address
January 1983 events in the United States
Articles containing video clips